Brendan P. Devlin (Irish: Breandán Ó Doibhlin) (born 1931) is a priest of the Derry Diocese. He was born in Rouskey, County Tyrone, Northern Ireland. He was educated in St Columb's College, Derry, St Patrick's College, Maynooth, and the Pontifical Irish College in Rome.

In 1958, he became professor of modern languages at St Patrick's College, Maynooth, a position he held until he retired in 1996. On 2 September 2013 he was the principal celebrant at the funeral of the poet Seamus Heaney.

Biography
Devlin is an accomplished polyglot and popular teacher who is particularly known for his work in French and in Irish. For many years, he was rector of the Irish College in Paris and has also published three novels in Irish: Néal Maidine agus Tine Oíche (1964), An Branar gan Cur (1979), and Sliocht ar Thír na Scáth (2018).  He has also published translations from French into Irish by La Fontaine, Pascal and Saint-Euxperry.  He translated several books of the Bible into Irish.

He worked closely with the historian Fr. Liam Swords who was since the late 1970s, the first Irish cleric in resident in the Irish College in Paris, since the second world war, to reestablish the Irish connection to the College, and its redevelopment and renovation as the Irish Cultural Institute, and Irish Chaplaincy in Paris. Devlin has visited the paris college in 1963, when there was no irish presence and it was used as a polish seminary, he resolved to reinstate it as an asset to the Irish people. He was appointed Rector of the Irish College by Cardinal O'Fiach in 1984.

In 2001, Devlin was invested as an Officer of the Légion d'honneur, the highest French award available to a foreign national.

References

20th-century Irish Roman Catholic priests
Alumni of St Patrick's College, Maynooth
Academics of St Patrick's College, Maynooth
20th-century Irish translators
21st-century Irish translators
1931 births
Pontifical Irish College alumni
Living people
People educated at St Columb's College
Translators to Irish
Translators of the Bible into Irish
Irish-language writers
Translators from French
French–Irish translators